The 2019 Liberty Bowl was a college football bowl game played on December 31, 2019, with kickoff at 3:45 p.m. EST (2:45 p.m. local CST) on ESPN. It was the 61st edition of the Liberty Bowl, and one of the 2019–20 bowl games concluding the 2019 FBS football season. Sponsored by automotive retailer AutoZone, the game was officially known as the AutoZone Liberty Bowl.

Teams
The game featured the Navy Midshipmen of the American Athletic Conference (AAC) and the Kansas State Wildcats of the Big 12 Conference. This was the first meeting between the two programs.

Navy

Navy entered the game with a 10–2 record (7–1 in conference), ranked 21st in the AP Poll. The Midshipmen finished tied with Memphis atop the West Division of the AAC; the Tigers advanced to the AAC Championship Game due to their win over Navy in September. Navy faced two ranked FBS teams during the season, defeating SMU and losing to Notre Dame.

Navy averaged 360.82 yards rushing per game during the regular season, 49 yards more than any other FBS team. Their 10 regular season wins, including a December 14 victory in the Army–Navy Game, was a seven-win improvement over their 2018 team that finished 3–10. This was Navy's second Liberty Bowl; their 1981 team appeared in that season's Liberty Bowl, losing to Ohio State, 31–28.

Kansas State

Kansas State entered the game with an 8–4 record, having recorded three more wins than their 2018 team. They were 5–4 in conference, finishing in a four-way tie for third place in the Big 12. The Wildcats defeated both ranked FBS teams they faced, Oklahoma and Iowa State. Kansas State head coach Chris Klieman previously led North Dakota State to four FCS titles.

During the regular season, the Wildcats allowed only 21.5 points per game and had the third-best passing defense based on passing yardage. Jordan Brown led the offense with 698 yards in only 10 games; as a team, they averaged 189 rushing yards per game. This was Kansas State's second Liberty Bowl; their 2015 team appeared in the 2016 Liberty Bowl, losing to Arkansas, 45–23.

Game summary

Statistics

References

External links

Game statistics at statbroadcast.com

Liberty Bowl
Liberty Bowl
Liberty Bowl
Liberty Bowl
Kansas State Wildcats football bowl games
Navy Midshipmen football bowl games